Harold Raymond "Mick" Gardner OBE (12 January 1899 – 17 February 1981) was an Australian politician. He was the member for Rockhampton in the Legislative Assembly of Queensland from 1956 to 1960, initially for the Labor Party and then from 1957 as part of the right-wing breakaway Queensland Labor Party. He contested the federal seat of Capricornia five times: for the ALP in 1949, 1951, 1954 and 1958 and for the QLP in 1961.

References

1899 births
1981 deaths
Queensland Labor Party members of the Parliament of Queensland
Members of the Queensland Legislative Assembly
Australian Labor Party members of the Parliament of Queensland
20th-century Australian politicians